2001 Canadian television series debuts
2000s Canadian reality television series
2001: A Space Road Odyssey is a 2001 Canadian television series that aired on Space channel. It documented a three-month journey across Canada in search for the paranormal.  It was hosted by videographer Natasha Eloi and voiceover personality Steve Anthony.